The Samsung E1170 is a mobile phone made by Samsung, released in 2010. It is designed for lower budget markets, and is similar to the Samsung E1107. The E1170T model is the same as the E1170, but has slight cosmetic changes (such as the 'supper man' nav button)

Features
 Browser
 Clock, Alarm, Calendar, Organizer
 Calculator, Converter
 T9 predictive text
 Hands-free operation, Vibration
 'Jewel Quest' Game
 Phone tracker
 Fake call
 SOS messages
 Torch light
 Stopwatch, Timer
 Profiles
 Wallpapers, Themes
 Power saving mode

E1170
Mobile phones introduced in 2010